Xu Qun (Simplified Chinese: 徐群) (born 22 January 1986 in Qingdao) is a Chinese football player.

Club career

Shandong Luneng
Xu Qun started his professional football career with Shandong Luneng in 2004 after he graduated from their various youth teams, however he was never able to make any senior level appearances for them during his time with them.

Qingdao Jonoon
By 2007 Xu Qun was allowed to transfer to Qingdao Jonoon along with fellow player Liu Qing. Xu Qun would make his debut against Shenzhen Shangqingyin on June 17, 2007 in a 2-0 win.

National team

U-17 National Team
Xu was a key member of China U-17 National Team compete in 2003 FIFA U-17 World Championship.

References

External links
Player stats at sohu.com

1986 births
Living people
Chinese footballers
Footballers from Qingdao
Shandong Taishan F.C. players
Qingdao Hainiu F.C. (1990) players
Chinese Super League players
Association football defenders